Giovanni Filippo Crescione or Cressione(Naples, 16th century) was an Italian painter, mainly active as a landscape painter.

Biography
He was a pupil of Marco Cardisco (1486–1542) and a collaborator of Lionardo Castellani. He was a contemporary of Giorgio Vasari (died 1574).

References

Year of birth missing
Year of death missing
16th-century Italian painters
Italian male painters
Painters from Naples